Lodenosine is a failed experimental agent for the treatment of HIV. Its development was discontinued on January 11, 2001.

References

Abandoned drugs
Nucleoside analog reverse transcriptase inhibitors
Organofluorides
Purines
Hydroxymethyl compounds